The Scooby & Scrappy-Doo/Puppy Hour is a 60-minute Saturday morning animated package show co-produced by Hanna-Barbera Productions and Ruby-Spears Enterprises and broadcast on ABC from September 25, 1982 to December 18, 1982. The show contained segments of Scooby-Doo & Scrappy-Doo (Hanna-Barbera), Scrappy & Yabba-Doo (Hanna-Barbera) and The Puppy's New Adventures (Ruby-Spears).

The first half-hour consisted of a 7-minute Scrappy & Yabba-Doo episode placed between two 7-minute Scooby-Doo & Scrappy-Doo episodes followed by a 30-minute episode of The Puppy's New Adventures in the second half-hour.<ref>[https://www.bcdb.com/cartoons/Hanna-Barbera_Studios/S/The_Scooby_and_Scrappy-Doo_Puppy_Hour/index.html The Scooby & Scrappy-Doo/Puppy Hour] at The Big Cartoon DataBase, retrieved September 27, 2015.</ref> The Scooby-Doo/Scrappy-related shorts were written, storyboarded and voiced at Hanna-Barbera, but animated and edited by Ruby-Spears.

 Scooby-Doo & Scrappy-Doo/Scrappy & Yabba-Doo Scooby-Doo & Scrappy-Doo: Scooby-Doo, Scrappy-Doo and Shaggy travel across the country as the "Fearless Detective Agency" and get involved in typical spy or criminal cases.Scrappy & Yabba-Doo:'' Scrappy-Doo's adventures with his uncle Yabba-Doo and Deputy Dusty in the wild west.

Episode list

Voice cast 
 Casey Kasem – Shaggy
 Don Messick – Scooby-Doo / Scrappy-Doo / Yabba-Doo
 Frank Welker – Deputy Dusty

The Puppy's New Adventures 

The adventures of Petey the Puppy and his friends – Dolly, Dash, Duke and Lucky – as they travel around the world together searching for his young owner Tommy and his family.

Episode list

Voice cast 
 Billy Jacoby – Petey the Puppy
 Nancy McKeon – Dolly
 Michael Bell – Duke / Dash
 Peter Cullen – Lucky

See also 
 List of Scooby-Doo media

References

External links 
 The Scooby & Scrappy-Doo/Puppy Hour at The Big Cartoon DataBase
 

Scooby-Doo package shows and programming blocks
1980s American animated television series
American animated television spin-offs
American children's animated action television series
American children's animated adventure television series
American children's animated comedy television series
American children's animated fantasy television series
American children's animated horror television series
American children's animated mystery television series
1982 American television series debuts
1982 American television series endings
American Broadcasting Company original programming
Television programming blocks in the United States
Scooby Scrappy-Doo Puppy Hour
Television series by Hanna-Barbera
Television series by Ruby-Spears